Comino is an island off Malta in the Mediterranean Sea.

Comino may also refer to:
 Comino Valley in central Italy
 Demetrius Comino (1902–1988), Australian inventor
 Comino Foundation, a training charity started by the inventor
 Athanassio Comino (1844–1897), an oyster merchant in Australia
 Domenico Comino, an Italian politician
 Another name for cumin, the spice
 A traditional Mexican spice mixture of whole Black Peppercorns and Cumin seed

See also
Camino (disambiguation)
Kamino (disambiguation)